Nationality words link to articles with information on the nation's poetry or literature (for instance, Irish or France).

Events

Works published

France
 Joachim du Bellay, À la ville du Mans
 Antoine Héroët, Opuscules d'amour par Héroet, La Borderie et autres divins poetes ("Booklets of Love by Heroet, La Borderie and other divine poets"), including Héroët's Complainte d'une dame nouvellement surprise d'amour; published in Lyon, France
 Marguerite de Navarre, Les Marguerites de la Marguerite des princesses, long devotional poem
 Maurice Scève, La Saulsaye, églogue de la vie solitaire ("The Willow Grove: Eclogue of the Solitary Life"), a pastoral poem consisting of a debate between two shepherds on the subject of the differences between town and country and on the court

Other
 Martynas Mažvydas, Catechismus ("The Simple Words of Catechismus"), the first printed Lithuanian book, includes a dedication in Latin "To the Great Duchy of Lithuania", two prefaces: in Latin (in prose), and in Lithuanian (in verse), a catechism, and the book of songs; the rhymed preface in Lithuanian, "The Appeal of The Small Book Itself Unto Lithuanians and Samogitians", has been called "the first authentic verse in Lithuanian"
 Tullia d'Aragona, Rime, Italy
 Giangiorgio Trissino, L'Italia liberata dai Goti ("The Deliverance of Italy from the Goths"), epic poem, Italy

Births
Death years link to the corresponding "[year] in poetry" article:
 Sheikh Bahaii  (died 1621), Persian scientist, architect, philosopher, and poet
 Gian Domenico Cancianini (died 1630), Italian, Latin-language poet
 Miguel de Cervantes (died 1616), Spanish novelist, poet, and playwright
 Faizi (died 1595), Indian poet laureate of the Emperor Akbar
 Johann Fischart born this year or 1546 (died 1591), German
 Martin Moller (died 1606), German poet and mystic
 Philipp Nicodemus Frischlin (died 1590), German  philologist, poet, playwright, mathematician and astronomer
 Richard Stanihurst, also spelled "Richard Stanyhurst" (died 1618), Irish  alchemist, translator, poet and historian
 Maciej Stryjkowski (died 1593), Polish-Lithuanian historian, writer and poet
 Roemer Visscher (died 1620), Dutch merchant and writer, especially of epigrams and emblemata

Deaths
Birth years link to the corresponding "[year] in poetry" article:
 January 18 – Pietro Bembo (born 1470), Italian cardinal, poet and writer
 January 19 – Henry Howard, Earl of Surrey, (born c. 1517), English poet and aristocrat, executed for treason
 February 25 – Vittoria Colonna (born 1490), Italian noblewoman and poet
 October or November – John Redford (born c. 1500), English composer, poet and playwright
 Also:
 Lazare de Baïf (born 1496), French poet, diplomat and humanist
 Meerabai मीराबाई (born 1498), alternate spelling: Meera, Mira, Meera Bai; Indian, Hindu poet-saint, mystical poet whose compositions, extant version of which are in Gujarati and a Rajasthani dialect of Hindi, remain popular throughout India

See also

 Poetry
 16th century in poetry
 16th century in literature
 French Renaissance literature
 Renaissance literature
 Spanish Renaissance literature

Notes

16th-century poetry
Poetry